Southside School District  is a school district in Southside, Independence County, Arkansas.

On July 1, 1990, the Oil Trough School District was dissolved, with portions going to the Southside School District.

Established in 1946 only one building was built during that time 7 buildings were built the middle school, high school, jr high school, elementary 

the football field “Scott field” was built in 1990 as with the field house

Schools

References

Athletics 
southside is the smallest 5A school in Arkansas sports included: football, softball, baseball, cheer, soccer, esports, archery, dance.

External links
 

School districts in Arkansas
Education in Independence County, Arkansas